Jarkko Immonen (born April 19, 1982) is a Finnish professional ice hockey forward currently playing for Mikkelin Jukurit of the Liiga.

Playing career
Immonen made his debut in Finland's second-tier league Mestis with TuTo Hockey during the 2000–01 season. For the following year, he joined Ässät of the country's top-tier Liiga. He then signed with fellow Liiga side JYP Jyväskylä in 2002 and remained three years at the club.

Immonen was drafted by the Toronto Maple Leafs in the 2002 NHL Entry Draft as their eighth round pick, 254th overall.

On March 3, 2004, Immonen was traded by the Maple Leafs to the New York Rangers as part of the Brian Leetch trade. He made his NHL debut for the Rangers during the 2005–06 season. In the course of his two-year stint with the Rangers, he played a total of 20 games in the NHL and mostly gained playing time in the American Hockey League (AHL) with the Hartford Wolf Pack. In his 141 AHL contests played, he scored 54 goals and had 75 assists.

He returned to Finland for the 2007-08 campaign, again joining JYP, where he spent another two years and won the Finnish championship in 2009, before signing with Ak Bars Kazan of the Kontinental Hockey League (KHL) shortly after. In his first year, he won the championship with Kazan. After four years with Ak Bars, Immonen decided to move on and join fellow KHL team Torpedo Nizhny Novgorod for the 2014–15 season.

On March 30, 2015, he agreed to a two-year contract with Swiss club, EV Zug of the NLA. At the conclusion of his contract with Zug, Immonen returned to Finland to play with his original club, JYP on a three-year contract from the 2017–18 season. 

On 14 April 2021, Immonen extended his professional career, leaving JYP as a free agent and signing a one-year contract with fellow Liiga club, Mikkelin Jukurit.

International play
Immonen won the bronze medal with Finland at the 2010 Vancouver Winter Olympics. He won the gold medal with Finland at the 2011 IIHF World Championship, where he scored the most goals (9 in 9 games) and the most points (12) in the tournament. He was also named to the all-star lineup.

Career statistics

Regular season and playoffs

International

References

External links

 Jarkko Immonen on nhlfinns.com

1982 births
Living people
Ak Bars Kazan players
Ässät players
EV Zug players
Finnish expatriate ice hockey players in Russia
Finnish ice hockey centres
Hartford Wolf Pack players
Ice hockey players at the 2010 Winter Olympics
Ice hockey players at the 2014 Winter Olympics
JYP Jyväskylä players
Medalists at the 2010 Winter Olympics
Medalists at the 2014 Winter Olympics
New York Rangers players
Olympic bronze medalists for Finland
Olympic ice hockey players of Finland
Olympic medalists in ice hockey
People from Rantasalmi
SaPKo players
Toronto Maple Leafs draft picks
Torpedo Nizhny Novgorod players
TuTo players
Sportspeople from South Savo